The 1918 South Carolina United States Senate special election was held on November 5, 1918 simultaneously with the regular senate election to select the U.S. Senator from the state of South Carolina to serve the remainder of the term for the 65th Congress.  The election resulted from the death of Senator Benjamin Tillman on July 3, 1918.  William P. Pollock won the Democratic primary and was unopposed in the general election to win the remaining four months of the term.

Democratic primary
The South Carolina Democratic Party held the primary on August 27 and William P. Pollock had a slight lead, but did not garner over 50% of the vote and was forced into a runoff election against Thomas H. Peeples.  On September 10, Pollock won the runoff and was thereby elected for the short term in the Senate because there was no opposition to the Democratic candidate in the general election.

General election results

|-
| 
| colspan=5 |Democratic hold
|-

See also
List of United States senators from South Carolina
1918 United States Senate elections
1918 United States House of Representatives elections in South Carolina
1918 South Carolina gubernatorial election

References

"Report of the Secretary of State to the General Assembly of South Carolina.  Part II." Reports of State Officers Boards and Committees to the General Assembly of the State of South Carolina. Volume II. Columbia, SC: 1919, p. 43.

South Carolina 1918
South Carolina 1918
1918 Special
South Carolina Special
United States Senate Special
United States Senate 1918
Single-candidate elections